Cornelius James Danahey (1 October 1856 – 1928) was an American-born Australian politician.

He was born to Irish parents in Detroit, where he attended Cass Union High School. An apprentice engineer from the age of thirteen, he moved to Australia around 1873 and worked as a machinery agent for a number of Sydney businesses. In 1884 he began working for the railway service as an engine fitter. In 1891 he was elected to the New South Wales Legislative Assembly for Canterbury as one of the first group of Labor Party politicians. However, by 1894 he had left Labor after refusing to sign the pledge, and he was defeated in Petersham as an independent Free Trade candidate. He ran again for Petersham in 1895 and for Uralla-Walcha in 1898, without success. He served with the Bushmen's Contingent in the Boer War. Danahey's final appearance in Australian politics was as the Labor candidate for Belubula at the 1910 New South Wales state election. Some time after this he moved to Canada, and he died in New Zealand in 1928.

References

 

1856 births
1928 deaths
Members of the New South Wales Legislative Assembly
Australian Labor Party members of the Parliament of New South Wales
American emigrants to Australia
Politicians from Detroit
Australian people of Irish descent
Australian military personnel of the Second Boer War